= Lobbying by the administration in the United States =

Lobbying in the United States is not restricted to commercial or private interests. The executive branch of the government also lobbies Congress (the federal government's legislative branch) to influence the passing of treaties. As an example, in 2010, Secretary of State Hillary Clinton lobbied Congress in an attempt to "save one of President Obama’s few foreign policy victories: an arms-control treaty with Russia". Clinton is expected to maintain her role as a lobbyist, due to Republican hesitance to pass any of the treaties proposed by President Barack Obama.
